Bruce D. Chilton (born September 27, 1949 Roslyn, NY) is an American scholar of early Christianity and Judaism, and an Episcopalian priest. He is Bernard Iddings Bell Professor of Religion at Bard College,  formerly Lillian Claus Professor of New Testament at Yale University, and Rector of the Church of St John the Evangelist He holds a PhD in New Testament from Cambridge University (St. John's College). He has previously held academic positions at the Universities of Cambridge, Sheffield, and Münster.

He wrote the first critical commentary on the Aramaic version of Isaiah (The Isaiah Targum, 1987), as well as academic studies that analyze Jesus in his Judaic context (A Galilean Rabbi and His Bible, 1984; The Temple of Jesus, 1992; Pure Kingdom, 1996), and explain the Bible critically (Redeeming Time: The Wisdom of Ancient Jewish and Christian Festal Calendars, 2002; The Cambridge Companion to the Bible, 2007).

He founded two academic  periodicals, Journal for the Study of the New Testament and The Bulletin for Biblical Research. 
Chilton was awarded the Doctor of Divinity degree honoris causa by General Theological Seminary in 2011. He has also been  active in the ministry of the Episcopal Church, and is Rector of the Church of St. John the Evangelist in Barrytown, New York.
 
His popular books have been widely reviewed.  Rabbi Jesus: An Intimate Biography showed Jesus' development through the environments that proved formative influences on him.  Those environments, illuminated by archaeology and by historical sources, include: (1) rural Jewish Galilee, (2) the movement of John the Baptist, (3) the towns Jesus encountered as a rabbi, (4) the political strategy of Herod Antipas, and (5) deep controversy concerning the Temple in Jerusalem.

Bruce and his wife, Odile, live in Annandale-on-Hudson, New York. They are the parents of two sons.

Works

Popular books

Academic books
 
 
 
 
  
 
 
 
 
  - republication of the 1984 title

Edited by

Chapters

References

1949 births
Academic journal editors
Alumni of St John's College, Cambridge
American biblical scholars
Bard College faculty
Critics of the Christ myth theory
Living people
New Testament scholars
Yale University faculty
Members of the Jesus Seminar